Sadie, It's Cold Outside is a British comedy television series which originally aired as a pilot on ITV in 1974 before a full series of six episodes was broadcast the following year. Created and written by Jack Rosenthal it starred Rosemary Leach as a housewife bored by her dull routine. The title references the song "Baby, It's Cold Outside".

Cast
 Rosemary Leach as Sadie Potter
 Bernard Hepton as Norman Potter
Patrick Newell as Shop keeper
Lesley Joseph as Cashier 
Janet Davies as Receptionist 
Donald Sumpter as Plumber 
John Ringham as Mr Callaghan
Robert Gillespie as Doctor

References

Bibliography
 Perry, Christopher . The British Television Pilot Episodes Research Guide 1936-2015. 2015.
 Vice, Sue. Jack Rosenthal. Manchester University Press, 2013.

External links
 
 

1975 British television series debuts
1975 British television series endings
1970s British comedy television series
ITV sitcoms
English-language television shows
Television shows produced by Thames Television